The Fiji national under-20 football team is controlled by the Fiji Football Association and represents Fiji in international under-20 football competitions.

Competitive record

FIFA U-20 World Cup record

OFC
The OFC Under 20 Qualifying Tournament is a tournament held once every two years to decide the two qualification spots for the Oceania Football Confederation (OFC) and its representatives at the FIFA U-20 World Cup.

Current technical staff

Current squad
The following players were called up for the 2022 OFC U-19 Championship from 7 to 20 September 2022. Names in italics denote players who have been capped for the Senior team.

Caps and goals as of 1 September 2022 before the game against Papua New Guinea.

|-
! colspan="9"  style="background:#b0d3fb; text-align:left;"|
|- style="background:#dfedfd;"

|-
! colspan="9"  style="background:#b0d3fb; text-align:left;"|
|- style="background:#dfedfd;"

|-
! colspan="9"  style="background:#b0d3fb; text-align:left;"|
|- style="background:#dfedfd;"

Recent call-ups
The following players have been called up for the pre-squad in the last twelve months.

|-
! colspan="9"  style="background:#b0d3fb; text-align:left;"|
|- style="background:#dfedfd;"

|-
! colspan="9"  style="background:#b0d3fb; text-align:left;"|
|- style="background:#dfedfd;"

|-
! colspan="9"  style="background:#b0d3fb; text-align:left;"|
|- style="background:#dfedfd;"

Fixtures and results 

International Matches in last 12 months, and future scheduled matches

2022

2023

Notes

References

External links
Fiji Football Federation official website

under-20
Oceanian national under-20 association football teams